Piusa is a village in Võru Parish, Võru County, in southeastern Estonia. It is located on the left bank of the river Piusa, near the border of Russia.

Piusa is famous for its sand caves along the river.

Sand quarries for glass production are active in Piusa since 1922.

Piusa has a station on the railway line that formerly linked Valga and Pechory.  Currently there are up to two services a day from Piusa to Koidula railway station on the border with Russia, with one service in each direction having a connection to / from Tartu.

On 4 May 2011 a shooting incident between police officers and local landowner took place on the territory of Piusa village, close to Võmmorski. As a result, the landowner and a police officer died and two were wounded.

References

Võru Parish
Villages in Võru County